The Desperado Trail is a 1965 West German film directed by Harald Reinl.

Plot 
After the Civil War, desperadoes led by a renegade named Rollins, following the settlers moving westward, try to drive a wedge in the friendship between the whites and the Indians. Apache chief Winnetou and his frontier friend, Old Shatterhand, do what they can to keep the peace. Rollins' henchmen try to keep Winnetou away from the warring Jicarillos' chief, White Buffalo, but he fights his way through, only to be confronted by Rollins carrying the chief's son, stabbed in the chest with Winnetou's knife. Winnetou is accused of the killing. It is up to Old Shatterhand to save his friend.

Cast

See also 
 Karl May film adaptations

External links 
 

1965 films
1965 Western (genre) films
German Western (genre) films
West German films
1960s German-language films
Films directed by Harald Reinl
Films produced by Horst Wendlandt
Winnetou films
Films shot in Croatia
Films shot in Yugoslavia
Columbia Pictures films
German sequel films
1960s buddy films
1960s historical films
Films set in the 19th century
Films set in New Mexico
German historical films
Constantin Film films
Yugoslav Western (genre) films
1960s German films
Foreign films set in the United States